Cadence is a 1990 American historical prison film directed by Martin Sheen, in which Charlie Sheen plays an inmate in a United States Army military prison in West Germany during the 1960s.  Sheen plays alongside his father Martin Sheen and brother Ramon Estevez. The film is based on a novel by Gordon Weaver.

Plot
Franklin Bean (Charlie Sheen), an Army private, is sentenced to 90 days in the stockade for drunkenly assaulting a military policeman on his base in West Germany in the 1960s. Master Sergeant McKinney (Martin Sheen) is the stockade commander who takes a dislike to the rebellious Bean.

Cast

Production

All soldiers wearing the shoulder sleeve distinct insignia of the Seventh United States Army.
Pvt. Bean is experiencing Chain gang (stockade shuffle) for his first time.
Martin Sheen received a Critics Award nomination at the Deauville Film Festival 1990.
Filming locations were Kamloops and Ashcroft, British Columbia (both in Canada) between July and August 1989.

Reception
On Rotten Tomatoes the film has an approval rating of 42% based on reviews from 12 critics. On Metacritic it has a score of 44% based on reviews from 16 critics, indicating "mixed or average reviews".

References

External links
 
 
 

1990 films
1990 drama films
Films scored by Georges Delerue
Films about American military personnel
Films based on American novels
Films set in West Germany
Films about race and ethnicity
Films set in the 1960s
Films directed by Martin Sheen
American prison drama films
New Line Cinema films
Republic Pictures films
Films about the United States Army
1990 directorial debut films
1990s English-language films
1990s American films